"What Are We Doin' Lonesome" is a song written by Larry Gatlin, and recorded by American country music group Larry Gatlin & the Gatlin Brothers Band.  It was released in October 1981, as the first single from the album Not Guilty.  The song reached number 4 on the Billboard Hot Country Singles & Tracks chart.

Chart performance

References

Songs about loneliness
1982 singles
1981 songs
Larry Gatlin songs
Columbia Records singles
Songs written by Larry Gatlin